Walsura gardneri is a species of plant in the family Meliaceae. It is endemic to Sri Lanka.

References

Flora of Sri Lanka
gardneri
Critically endangered plants
Taxonomy articles created by Polbot